A Month by the Lake is a 1995 romantic comedy film starring Vanessa Redgrave, Edward Fox and Uma Thurman. The picture is directed by John Irvin and is based on the story by H.E. Bates. The supporting cast features Alida Valli and Alessandro Gassman.

Plot synopsis
In 1937, two years before World War II, a spinster named Miss Bentley has returned to Lake Como to spend a month's summer holiday to heal herself from the grief of her father's recent death. While there, she meets a bachelor named Major Wilshaw and develops some feelings for him. However, a young American girl named Miss Beaumont arrives and flirts with the major out of sheer boredom, leading him to believe she's actually interested in him.

Cast
 Vanessa Redgrave as Miss Bentley
 Edward Fox as Major Wilshaw
 Uma Thurman as Miss Beaumont
 Alida Valli as Signora Fascioli
 Alessandro Gassman as Vittorio Balsari

Critical reception
In a contemporary review Roger Ebert called the film; "a sly romantic comedy about a collision of sex, ego, will and pride, all peeping out from beneath great thick layers of British reticence. Its delights are wrapped in a lavish production in a beautiful time and place."

Awards
In 1996, Redgrave was nominated for a Golden Globe Award for Best Actress in a Motion Picture Musical or Comedy, losing to Nicole Kidman for To Die For. This marks John Irvin's first Golden Globe nominated film.

References

External links
 
 
 

1995 films
1995 romantic comedy films
American romantic comedy films
British romantic comedy films
Films directed by John Irvin
Films set in Italy
Films set in 1937
Films scored by Nicola Piovani
1990s English-language films
1990s American films
1990s British films